Vaceuchelus semilugubris is a species of sea snail, a marine gastropod mollusk in the family Chilodontidae.

Description
The height of the shell attains 3.5 mm.
The small shell has a turbinate, subglobose shape. Its color is white, marbled with black. The spire is somewhat obtuse. The five whorls are declivous above and spirally deeply sulcate.  The sulci are subgranulose. The body whorl is large with a perforate base. The very oblique aperture is circular and pearly within. The flat columella is arcuate and truncate anteriorly.

Distribution
This marine shell occurs in the Indian Ocean off Réunion and Mauritius.

References

External links
 Deshayes, G. P. (1863). Catalogue des mollusques de l'île de la Réunion (Bourbon). Pp. 1-144. In Maillard, L. (Ed.) Notes sur l'Ile de la Réunion. Dentu, Paris.
 To Encyclopedia of Life
 Herbert, D. G. (2012). A Revision of the Chilodontidae (Gastropoda: Vetigastropoda: Seguenzioidea) of Southern Africa and the South-Western Indian Ocean. African Invertebrates. 53(2): 381-502
 To World Register of Marine Species
 

semilugubris
Gastropods described in 1863